Yves Bertucci (born 24 October 1962) is a French football manager and former player. He is currently the assistant manager of Toulouse FC.

He was assistant coach at Paris Saint-Germain, having in February 2009 being replaced by Daniel Jeandupeux as the manager of Le Mans Union Club.

References

External links
 Yves Bertucci, un homme de club, Le Mans UC72 official site

Living people
1962 births
Association football midfielders
French footballers
AS Cannes players
Tours FC players
Ligue 2 players
French football managers
Le Mans FC managers
Ligue 1 managers
FC Montceau Bourgogne players
USL Dunkerque players